Lobogenesis peruviana is a species of moth of the family Tortricidae. It is found in Peru.

Description
The length of the fore-wings is 7.5 mm for males and 8 mm for females. The forewings are silver white with pale yellowish over-scaling. The hindwings are whitish with pale grayish mottling.

Etymology
The species name refers to the country where the species is found.

References

Moths described in 2000
Euliini